The Little Vermilion River is a  tributary of the Illinois River, which it joins near LaSalle, Illinois, opposite the north-flowing Vermilion River. There is another "Little Vermilion River" in Illinois which is a tributary of the Wabash River.

Land Use
Approximately 75% of the land of the land in the watershed is devoted to agricultural activities, primarily corn and soybean production. Native wetlands account for 0.5% of land in the watershed.

Water Quality

An EPA report lists the southern section near La Salle, Illinois as impaired waterway due to excessive zinc from current and  historic mining operations. It is also listed for elevated fecal coliform bacteria levels due to the use of combined sewage overflow systems in use by several municipalities within the watershed.

See also
List of Illinois rivers
Watersheds of Illinois

References

External links
Prairie Rivers Network

Rivers of Illinois
Tributaries of the Illinois River
Rivers of LaSalle County, Illinois